HD 128311 is a variable star in the northern constellation of Boötes. It has the variable star designation HN Boötis, while HD 128311 is the star's designation in the Henry Draper Catalogue. The star is invisible to the naked eye with an apparent visual magnitude that fluctuates around 7.48. It is located at a distance of 53 light years from the Sun based on parallax, but is drifting closer with a radial velocity of −9.6 km/s. Two confirmed extrasolar planets have been detected in orbit around this star.

The stellar classification of HN Boo is K3V, which indicates this is a K-type main sequence star. It is a BY Draconis-type variable, randomly varying in brightness by 0.04 in magnitude over a period of 11.54 days due to star spots and high chromospheric activity. The star exhibits strong emission, which suggests an age of 0.5–1.0 billion years. It has 82% of the mass of the Sun and 78% of the Sun's radius. The metallicity of the star, meaning its abundance of heavier elements, appears slightly higher than in the Sun. It is radiating 31% of the luminosity of the Sun from its photosphere at an effective temperature of 4,863 K.

Planetary system 

In 2002, the discovery of the exoplanet HD 128311 b was announced by Paul Butler. In 2005, the discovery of a second exoplanet HD 128311 c was announced by Steve Vogt.

Most likely, the system has been formed in a very turbulent disc. The authors were able to show with both analytic and numerical models that certain libration modes are readily excited by turbulence. It was initially thought that the system could have been resulted from planet–planet scattering, but this is rather unlikely.

In 2014, the true mass of HD 128311 c was measured via astrometry. The same study also proposed a third planetary candidate, but it has not been confirmed.

See also 
List of extrasolar planets

References

External links

External links
 GJ 3860
 Extrasolar Planet Interactions by Rory Barnes & Richard Greenberg, Lunar and Planetary Lab, University of Arizona
 Image HD 128311


K-type main-sequence stars
BY Draconis variables
Planetary systems with two confirmed planets

Boötes
Durchmusterung objects
Gliese and GJ objects
128311
071395
Boötis, HN